HemK methyltransferase family member 1 is a protein that in humans is encoded by the HEMK1 gene.

References